Sigalda Power Plant ("Sigalda station" ) is an electric generating plant located in the southern Highlands of Iceland near Þórisvatn. It is the biggest reservoir in Iceland, located around 160 km east from Reykjavík, among Hrauneyjalón and Krókslón reservoirs. It was officially launched early 1978. This power plant is the newest of six other hydroelectric plants (Búrfell, Búðarháls, Vatnsfell, Sultartangi, Hrauneyjafoss). Its construction was quick. It created demand for more hydropower plants to meet electricity needs in the country. Sigalda with Tungnaá river is at the top of the canyon on Sigalda hill.

Design 
Construction of the Sigalda Hydroelectric Power Station began in 1978, and included three 50-MW turbines. The Sigalda Station is linked into the national grid with 220 kV transmission lines to the Sultartangi, Hrauneyjafoss and Vatnsfell Stations, as well as a 132-kV line to southeast Iceland. Together the installed capacity measures 150 МВт and is able to produce 650 gWh p.a. with a flow rate of 230 m³/s. 

Sigalda Dam dams the Tungnaá River at the top of the canyon above Sigalda Hill, where it forms Krókslón, a 14 km2 reservoir. The rock-fill dam is 925 m long, clad with asphalt, and 40 m tall at its highest point. The water is carried 1 km through an intake canal from Krókslón Reservoir to the western edge of Sigalda Hill. Three pressure shafts, 216 m long and 4.3 m in diameter, run to the powerhouse north of the old riverbed, in part buried inside the Sigalda hillside. The harnessed head is 74 m. A 550 m tailrace canal leads from the powerhouse into the Hrauneyjafoss Reservoir.

External links 

 Sigalda Power Station

Hydroelectric power stations in Iceland